City limits are the defined boundary of a city.

City Limits may also refer to:
 City Limits (magazine), a magazine in London
 City Limits (New York magazine), a New York City investigative journalism magazine founded in 1976
 City Limits (TV series), a Canadian television series
 City Limits (1934 film), a 1934 American comedy film
 City Limits (1985 film), a 1985 film
 City Limits (2004 film), a 2004 crime film
 City Limits, a 1961 album by The Wilburn Brothers
 City Limit, album by Billy Ocean